Chi-fu Huang (黄奇辅; born 1955) is a private investor, a retired hedge fund manager, and a former finance academic. He has made contributions to the theory of financial economics, writing on dynamic general equilibrium theory, intertemporal utility theory, and the theory of individual consumption and portfolio decisions.  

He is a Managing Member of CMASH, LLC, a member of the Management Committee of Starling Ventures LLC, a Board Member of DeepMacro, 9M Technologies, and an owner of numbersgamewines.com. He serves on the Advisory Board of the Dean of School of Sciences, Massachusetts Institute of Technology.

Early life
Huang received his B.A. in Economics from National Taiwan University in 1977 and Ph.D. in Financial economics from Stanford University in the United States in 1983. He was on the faculty of the MIT Sloan School of Management from 1983 to 1994, and was a full professor holding the J.C. Penney Professorship in Finance when he left MIT in the summer of 1994.

Career 
Huang co-founded, with Myron Scholes, Platinum Grove Asset Management L.P. (PGAM), an investment management company based in Rye Brook, New York in 1999. He was the Chief Executive Officer and Chief Investment Officer of PGAM from 1999 to 2009, and served as Non-Executive Chairman from 2010 to 2013. See Myron Scholes #Investment activity. PGAM was one of the largest fixed income relative value focused hedge funds in the ten years Huang was its CEO and CIO.

Before founding PGAM, Huang was with Long Term Capital Management L.P. from 1995 to 1999 and was a Partner and Co-Head of its Asia office in Tokyo from 1997 to 1999. Prior to that he was Head of Fixed Income Derivatives Research at Goldman, Sachs & Co. in New York from 1993 to 1994.

He was an editor of Review of Financial Studies and an associate editor of Journal of Economic Theory, Journal of Financial and Quantitative Analysis, Mathematical Finance, and Journal of Mathematical Economics. He is the author of more than thirty articles and is co-author, with Robert H. Litzenberger, of Foundations for Financial Economics (Prentice Hall, 1988. .), a textbook for graduate students in financial markets.

Research
As an academic, his most extensive work has been in dynamic general equilibrium theory. Here he has developed two main themes. The first theme concerns the relations between the revelation of new information to the agents in an economy and the characteristics of asset prices in an economy. His results justified some key assumptions underlying much of the modern work on asset pricing.

The second main theme concerns the critical allocational role of securities markets. Previous research suggested that an efficient allocation of resources would require markets for far more securities than actually exist. Huang's work shifted the focus of discussion from the number of markets to the nature of dynamic trading opportunities. He showed that an efficient allocation of resources could in fact be obtained with relatively few securities as long as these securities could be traded continuously.

In his work on individual consumption and portfolio decisions, Huang provided a new approach to this classic economic topic. Many inherent dynamic optimization problems in this area have proved impossible to solve. Huang showed how these seemingly intractable problems can be broken into two easy-to-solve parts, one involving a static optimization problem and the other a dynamic problem without optimization.

Huang's work on utility theory has allowed researchers to include in their models some intuitively appealing aspects of individual preferences that were previously ignored because they were too difficult to formalize. Additionally, he has expanded the applicability of auction theory to financial markets by studying price behavior in actions conducted by participants who are purchasing items for resale rather than for their own use.

References

External links
Executive Profile: Chi-Fu Huang, businessweek.com
Small Bio of Chi-fu Huang (archived), wsren.org
Author page, SSRN
Platinum Grove Asset Management, L.P. (archived)
Company Overview of OpHedge Investment Services, LLC, businessweek.com

1955 births
Living people
American people of Chinese descent
American people of Taiwanese descent
MIT Sloan School of Management faculty
Financial economists
National Taiwan University alumni
Long-Term Capital Management
Goldman Sachs people